The 1963–64 St. Francis Terriers men's basketball team represented St. Francis College during the 1963–64 NCAA men's basketball season. The team was coached by Daniel Lynch, who was in his sixteenth year at the helm of the St. Francis Terriers. The team played as an independent and was not affiliated with a conference. The Terriers played their home games at the 69th Regiment Armory in Manhattan.

The Terriers finished the season at 9–12.

Roster

Schedule and results

|-
!colspan=12 style="background:#0038A8; border: 2px solid #CE1126;;color:#FFFFFF;"| Regular Season

References

St. Francis Brooklyn Terriers men's basketball seasons
St. Francis
Saint Francis
Saint Francis